Line of Fire: The Morris Dees Story is a 1991 American drama film directed by John Korty and written by James G. Hirsch and Charles Rosin. The film stars Corbin Bernsen, Jenny Lewis, Sandy Bull, John M. Jackson, Angela Bassett and James Staley. The film premiered on NBC on January 21, 1991.

Plot
Based on the true story of Morris Dees, a civil rights lawyer from Alabama, whose Southern Poverty Law Center battles neo-Nazis and the Ku Klux Klan.

Cast  
Corbin Bernsen as Morris Dees
Jenny Lewis as Ellie
Sandy Bull as Stanton
John M. Jackson as Curtis
Angela Bassett as Pat
James Staley as Welch
Casey Biggs as Lee
Harold Sylvester as Gilbert
James Parks as Tiger Knowles
Carl Anthony Payne II as Michael Donald
Ann Weldon as Mrs. Donald
Hal Havins as Teddy Kysar
David Gale as Benny Hays
Marnie Andrews as Maureen Dees
Beau Billingslea as Hal
Wayne Tippit as Tillman
Shaun Duke as J. Richard Cohen
Wiley M. Pickett as Henry Hays
Le Tuan as Col. Min
Roger Rook as David Andrews
Roger Steffens as Reporter
Conni Marie Brazelton as Reporter
John Nesci as Alan Berg

References

External links
 

1991 television films
1991 films
1990s English-language films
1991 drama films
NBC network original films
Films directed by John Korty
Films scored by Arthur B. Rubinstein
Films scored by Billy Goldenberg
American drama television films
1990s American films